Theodoric I was the king of the Visigoths from 453 to 466.

Theodoric I (or Theoderic I, in French Thierry I) may also refer to:

Theuderic I, Frankish king of Austrasia (511–533/534)
Theodoric I of Paderborn, bishop (908–916)
Theodoric I of Wettin (died c. 975)
Theodoric I, Duke of Upper Lorraine (978–1027)
Theodoric I, Count of Montbéliard (1073–1105)
Theodoric I, Margrave of Lusatia (1156–1185)
Theodoric I, Margrave of Meissen (1198–1221)

See also
Theodoric, other persons with the name
Dietrich I (disambiguation), the German form of the name
Dirk I (disambiguation), the Dutch form of the name